The University City of Caracas is a World Heritage Site in Caracas, Venezuela. It is a functional university campus for the Central University of Venezuela, as well as home to 108 notable works of art and famous examples of creative architecture. Many works of art are modernist and mosaic. The campus was designed by architect Carlos Raúl Villanueva, who oversaw much of the construction and design work, with the artwork overseen by Mateo Manaure.

Villanueva primarily enlisted artists who were either European or had European influences – Villanueva himself had been inspired for the campus design in Paris – including members of Los Disidentes, a group of Venezuelan artists who left for Europe to break from the Mexican mural tradition. Some artists did not initially want to work on the project, as they were opposed to the military dictatorship in place in Venezuela at the time, but French artist Fernand Léger encouraged them to participate by saying that "dictatorships pass but art remains"; part of Villanueva's intention was unity.

In their book Modern Architecture in Latin America: Art, Technology, and Utopia, Carranza and Lara discuss the 'movements' of Villanueva's Synthesis of the Arts, and the functions of certain pieces within their spaces.

By Venezuelan artists

"El primer libro"
Just inside the main entrance of the Central Library is a stone depicting a petroglyph, carved by ancient indigenous people of Venezuela. The story of its placement is that it is the first book of the library, waiting for somebody to come and read it, but nobody can because the language is lost. Based on comments from scholars and university figures, it has been deemed that these people do not consider the petroglyph stone to be part of the university's heritage, nor as one of the campus works of art; the same distancing is seen with other elements of indigenous culture across the country. Map reference on this page: L5.

Francisco Narváez

Construction of the campus began in the late 1940s, with the first artworks being installed in 1950. These were designed by Francisco Narváez for the medical complex. Narváez, an old friend of Villanueva, created many pieces of artwork for the campus, in various media.:137

The mosaics at the entrance to the Institute of Experimental Medicine were installed by María Luisa Tovar. Three statues by Narváez on the campus are made of  Cumarebo stone: El Atleta, a large statue in the sports complex, and La educación and La ciencia in the medical complex.:137 These last two are detailed depictions of female nudity,:137 something Narváez covers in his art with different materials frequently. The Cumarebo stone is a favorite material of Narváez. A slightly later statue, La cultura (identified as "Sculpture" in Fraser's book), is more figurative, showing the influence of the European artists designing for the campus on Narváez.:137

Alejandro Colina
Alejandro Colina made María Lionza, a statue of María Lionza, in 1951; a replica sits just outside the university on the Francisco Fajardo freeway, but the work is nevertheless owned by the university, protected by the university's artwork commission for the heritage site, and generally viewed as part of the campus environs. Restorer Fernando de Tovar has described the replica as "ridiculous"; it was made by Silvestre Chacón in 2004, to protect the original, which has significant heritage value. This has been a point of controversy, with some arguing that the original's heritage means it should be the only one displayed, rather than hidden for safekeeping. The original statue has been kept locked in a workshop at UCV since 2004, despite orders to put it back along the highway. It was significantly damaged when the local council took the mold to create the replica.

The statue was originally made to sit outside the Olympic Stadium for the 1951 Bolivarian Games. With the expansion of the city, the road system was made larger, and the statue was moved a short distance to an island between lanes of the highway.

Armando Barrios
Villanueva approached Armando Barrios in 1952 to create a number of murals for the campus. Barrios' murals are mosaics made of glass, and are considered part of his "abstract-geometric" period. After 1954, his work became less abstract and incorporated more identifiable human figures. As a music lover, Barrios incorporated a musical flow into his designs.

Carranza and Lara wrote that the mural "aims at dematerializing the structure and form" of the museum away from a purely functional grid-like building.

The Olympic Stadium murals use mosaic tiles imported from Venice. The mural here with horizontal stripes is also considered "melodic", with Ronnie Saravo Sánchez writing that the use of color and the Renaissance influence "link it conceptually with movements such as Cubism and Russian constructivism, [and] served as a support for the creation of a new universe where the figure and background are diluted until reaching an almost abstract stylization".

Carlos Gonzaléz Bogen
Bogen lived in Paris from 1948 until 1951, returning to Venezuela to open a gallery with Mateo Manaure and contribute murals to the campus. Bogen had already cultivated an interest in combining art and architecture when making great murals for walls and doors, and the Synthesis of the Arts project allowed him to explore this. He also contributed several works, including murals and glassworks, to the UCV CDCH campus.

Mateo Manaure

Mateo Manaure has a reported 26 pieces of work on the campus. Though his pieces are mostly ceramic murals, he also created wooden acoustic frames and stained-glass windows. In addition, he created ventilation elements of the hospital lobby, and was the artwork supervisor of the project.

Héctor Poleo
 painted an unnamed fresco during 1953 and 1954 that adorns the wall of the first floor of the Rector's office in the Rectory building. The mural reflects "the academic character of the university and the [Rector's] office". A detail of the mural was used on a souvenir sheet printed by IPOSTEL in 1983 that celebrated the bicentenary of Simón Bolívar's birth.

Carlos Raúl Villanueva & Juan Otaola Paván

Villanueva designed the entire campus, and also contributed significantly to the artwork and design of the UCV Clock Tower, working with Otaola. The clock tower is considered to be of revolutionary structural and symbolic design.

Harry Abend

Abend, an alumnus of the Architecture school of UCV, incorporated this practice into his sculptures, including the one situated on the campus. He worked often with tridimensional shapes, something else shown in the piece.

Pedro León Castro

Completed in 1954, Castro's mural is considered a work of Social realism.

Pascual Navarro
The Navarro murals of the Plaza Cubierta are easily recognized, but his mural in the library is considered a "hidden treasure" and was for a while closed off from the public due to renovations between 2007 and 2011.

Alírio Oramas

Oramas spent time in Europe in the early 1950s, and upon his return in 1956 contributed to creating artworks specifically for the campus. He made what is said to be four murals, three for the library and one for the FAU.

Alejandro Otero

Otero had been visiting Paris in the early 1950s, but returned to Venezuela to contribute to the project. A postcard featuring a photograph of his stained-glass window was published in 2007 by IPOSTEL.

Oswaldo Vigas
Oswaldo Vigas' murals form a lot of the views of the south of Rectory Plaza. Carranza and Lara describe Vigas' murals as part of Villanueva's second movement within the rhythm of the campus design, saying that they "are intended to give an impression of lightening the feeling of the Administration building and to highlight the dynamic form of the Communications building".

Victor Valera

Miguel Arroyo

Braulio Salazar

In 1953 Villanueva asked Salazar to produce a stained-glass window for the university.

Jesús Rafael Soto

Omar Carreño

Carreño designed the artwork and building of the entire interior and exterior of the Faculty of Dentistry; he is the only artist who contributed to the campus to create the works of an entire building alone.

Félix George

George was an established sculptor and doctor, who also taught at UCV until he died in 2019. As a head of department in the Faculty of Medicine, several of his sculptures were in the grounds where he worked.

Gego 
One of Gego's sculptures is in the library building of the Faculty of Architecture and Urbanism.

Ernest Maragall i Noble

Guillermo Pinto

Ibelise Lagos

Oswaldo Lares

Pedro León Zapata
Pedro León Zapata created a giant mural for the campus, Conductores de Venezuela, constructed over several years and finished in 1999. It depicts historical Venezuelan figures, and normal people, driving.

Oscar Olivares

Olivares designed and directed the painting of a mural in the Botanical Garden intended to renovate the space, he created it with the assistance of volunteers who had been clearing the gardens to make it healthier.

By international artists

Alexander Calder
In terms of the campus, Calder is most famous for his Floating Clouds, but in fact made four pieces for the campus: the acoustic panels, a mobile, and two sculptures.

Henri Laurens

Henri Laurens created one work that is placed on the campus, L'Amphion.

Baltasar Lobo

Lobo created Maternidad, which sits on the campus.

Antoine Pevsner

One of Antoine Pevsner's Constructivist sculptures, this piece intends to show "unfolding movement in space" and "infinite surface development". This specifically shows a representation of diagonal movement with thrust at a 30° angle. It was designed in 1950/51.

Jean (Hans) Arp
Arp's 1954 sculpture known as the Berger des nuages, Pastor de nubes, or Cloud Shepherd, is a large abstract sculpture behind the Aula Magna.

He also made a relief mural for the campus, called Siluetas en relieve. The restoration of this mural was a complicated process because of how the shapes comprising the piece had been attached to the wall behind. It largely focused on maintaining the integrity of the original as it had been placed, removing salt stains and other damage acquired by exposure.

André Bloc
Bloc's mural's location is now a Bank of Venezuela.

Fernand Léger

Victor Vasarely

Sophie Taeuber-Arp

Wifredo Lam

Pablo Toscano

Map of artworks

Complete list

Notes

References 

Ciudad Universitaria de Caracas
University City of Caracas
Venezuelan art
World Heritage Sites in Venezuela